Shankovo is a rural locality (a village) in Kupriyanovskoye Rural Settlement, Gorokhovetsky District, Vladimir Oblast, Russia. The population was 18 as of 2010.

Geography 
Shankovo is located on the Suvoroshch River, 16 km southeast of Gorokhovets (the district's administrative centre) by road. Timiryazevo is the nearest rural locality.

References 

Rural localities in Gorokhovetsky District